Keisha Castle-Hughes (born 24 March 1990) is an Australian-born New Zealand actress who rose to prominence for playing Paikea "Pai" Apirana in the film Whale Rider. She was nominated for several awards, including the Academy Award for Best Actress (the second youngest person nominated in the Best Actress category) and the Broadcast Film Critics Association Award for Best Young Actor/Actress, which she won.

Castle-Hughes has appeared in various films including Hey, Hey, It's Esther Blueburger, Piece of My Heart and Star Wars: Revenge of the Sith. She also performed as Mary of Nazareth in the 2006 film The Nativity Story. In 2015, she joined the cast of the HBO TV series Game of Thrones in Season 5 as Obara Sand.

Early life
Castle-Hughes was born in 1990 in Donnybrook, Western Australia to a Māori mother, Desrae Hughes, and Tim Castle, an Anglo-Australian father. Her family moved to Auckland, New Zealand when she was four years old. She attained citizenship in 2001. Castle-Hughes attended Penrose High School and graduated from Senior College of New Zealand in Auckland.

Career
In 2002, Castle-Hughes made her debut in the film Whale Rider, in which she played the main role of Paikea Apirana (Pai). She had no previous acting experience and went directly from her Auckland school classroom to the film set when the shoot began in New Zealand in late 2001. Castle-Hughes received widespread critical acclaim for her performance, and in 2004 she received an Academy Award nomination for Best Actress at the 76th Academy Awards. Although she did not win the Best Actress award (it went to Charlize Theron for Monster), at age 13 she became the youngest person nominated in this category at the time and the second Polynesian actress, after Jocelyne LaGarde, to be nominated for an Oscar.

She soon followed the role by appearing in Prince's controversial "Cinnamon Girl" music video and with a shoot in Vanity Fair magazine. In 2004, Castle-Hughes was invited to join the Academy of Motion Picture Arts and Sciences.

In 2005, Castle-Hughes had a small part as Queen Apailana in Star Wars: Revenge of the Sith. In 2006, she portrayed the starring role of the Virgin Mary in The Nativity Story. New York Times critic, A. O. Scott, said that she "seemed entirely unfazed by the demands of playing Mary. She had the poise and intelligence to play the character not as an icon of maternity, but rather as a headstrong, thoughtful adolescent transformed by an unimaginable responsibility." The Christian-themed film earned only $8 million during its opening week, but its box office surged during the week of Christmas.

In 2008, Castle-Hughes appeared in the Australian comedy-drama film Hey, Hey, It's Esther Blueburger, which was filmed in late 2006.

Castle-Hughes reunited with New Zealand director Niki Caro for the film adaption of The Vintner's Luck, which had its international premiere in September 2009.

Castle-Hughes starred in the Japanese horror film Vampire, and she also played a recurring role as Axl's flatmate in The Almighty Johnsons which premiered in 2011. In 2011 Castle-Hughes also played a minor part in the film Red Dog as Rosa the veterinary assistant and wife of Vanno.

In 2014, Castle-Hughes had a guest role in the American television series The Walking Dead in which she played Joan.

In 2015, she joined the cast of the HBO TV series Game of Thrones in Season 5 as Obara Sand. She pursued a role on the show in part because she is a fan of the books. Castle-Hughes found out that she had won the role the night the Season 4 episode "The Mountain and the Viper" aired, in which her on-screen father's death was shown. She described having a very intense emotional reaction to the scene, because of the connection between the characters on the show.

Beginning in 2020, Castle-Hughes has played Hana Gibson, an FBI analyst, on CBS's FBI: Most Wanted.

In February 2023, Simpson guest voiced Emerie Karr, the Imperial administrator of the Mount Tantiss facility, in Star Wars: The Bad Batch.

Activism
Castle-Hughes campaigned for Greenpeace as part of the SignOn.org.nz climate campaign in 2009. New Zealand Prime Minister John Key initially admonished her to "stick to acting", but offered a week later to discuss the issues with her over tea after she maintained she knew more about them than he gave her credit for.

Personal life
In October 2006, when she was 16, it was announced that Castle-Hughes and boyfriend Bradley Hull were expecting a child together. Their daughter was born in 2007. Castle-Hughes and Hull broke up in 2010 after seven years together.

In 2012, Castle-Hughes began dating Jonathan Morrison. After six weeks together, the couple became engaged in August 2012. Their wedding took place on Valentine's Day 2013. They were divorced in December 2016.

In early 2014, Castle-Hughes revealed that she has bipolar disorder, in the wake of television personality Charlotte Dawson's suicide.

In early 2021, she married Donny Grahamer in New York City. A month later she announced that she was pregnant with her second child, a daughter born in June.

Filmography

Accolades

See also
 List of oldest and youngest Academy Award winners and nominees 
List of actors with Academy Award nominations

References

Further reading

External links

 
 
 

1990 births
Living people
21st-century Australian actresses
21st-century New Zealand actresses
Actresses from Western Australia
Australian child actresses
Australian emigrants to New Zealand
Australian film actresses
Australian people of English descent
Australian people of Māori descent
Australian television actresses
Naturalised citizens of New Zealand
New Zealand child actresses
New Zealand film actresses
New Zealand Māori actresses
New Zealand people of Australian descent
New Zealand people of English descent
New Zealand television actresses
People from Donnybrook, Western Australia
People educated at One Tree Hill College
People with bipolar disorder